Monica Seles was the reigning champion but did not compete this year, as she decided to play in Dubai in the same week.

Lisa Raymond won the title by defeating Alexandra Stevenson 4–6, 6–3, 7–6(11–9) in the final.

Seeds
The first two seeds received a bye into the second round.

Draw

Finals

Top half

Bottom half

References
 Official results archive (ITF)
 Official results archive (WTA)
 

2002 Kroger St. Jude International
2002 WTA Tour